Storuman (Ume Sami: Lusspie) is a locality and the seat of Storuman Municipality in Västerbotten County, province of Lapland, Sweden with 2,207 inhabitants in 2010. It is situated by the Ume River, at the southeastern end of Lake Storuman.

History 

It is believed that the first Swedish people who came to the area, were from Vilhelmina to the south and settled here around 1741. The place became known as 'Luspen', derived from a local river of the same name. Until 1912, the population of the village was about 40 inhabitants living in eight farms, but that changed when a railway station was built (Inland Line) around 1924. The village quickly grew and became known as an important centre for hydroelectric power and the timber industry. It later became a popular tourist spot as well.

The heraldic shield (the weapon of the town) is a Wild man, based on the name of the village and the symbols of the strength and determination of the people of Lapland.

Notable people   
Johanna Olofsson, professional ice hockey player for Luleå HF/MSSK

References

See also
 Blue Highway, an international tourist route

Populated places in Västerbotten County
Populated places in Storuman Municipality
Municipal seats of Västerbotten County
Swedish municipal seats
Lapland (Sweden)